Lucknow City Transport Services Limited (LCTSL) is an urban bus service of UPSRTC which operates in the urban areas of Lucknow

History
Lucknow City Transport Services Limited, popularly known as City Bus Service, was established to cater to the increasing needs of commuters. The service started in 2005, when 100 buses were introduced. In 2010, a new fleet of Buses including low floor buses was introduced. It is part of Jawaharlal Nehru National Urban Renewal Mission.

Organization
Lucknow City Transport Services Limited headquarters are at Triloki Nath Marg. Its four depots are Gomti Nagar, Charbagh, Amausi, and Dubagga. The larger buses are parked in Gomti Nagar and Charbagh, and the mini buses are parked in Dubagga and Amausi.

The terminals are at Gudamba, Virajkhand, Alambagh, Scooter India, Engineering college, B.B.D., Pasi Qila, Charbagh, Andhe ki Chowki, and Budheshwar Chowraha. It has a total of 1500 employees.

Fleet
 
The fleet currently consists of 260 buses, in which there are 15 A/c, 30 Non A/c low Floor Marcoplo Buses, 90 Tata Buses and 125 Mazda Buses all of which run on compressed natural gas (CNG) & Electric system.

Low Floor Bus Service

Lucknow Mahanagar Parivahan Sewa operates a large number of low floor buses under the title UPSRTC JNNURM: Low Floor Bus Service. These buses are coloured according to whether or not they have air conditioning: air-conditioned buses are dark blue and white, while non air-conditioned buses are purple and white. All low floor buses in Lucknow are operated by TATA Marcopolo. These buses are equipped with automatic doors, all of the required security measures, and can be used by disabled people. Low floor buses are now being equipped with GPS and are capable of displaying the name of the next stop.

Semi Low-Floor Bus Service

Semi Low-Floor Buses are more common. These buses are equipped with basic security measures as well as GPS. The name of each approaching stop is both displayed and announced. This type of bus has open doorways, and consequently takes less time at stops than buses with automatic doors. The lack of doors enables passengers to ride on the exterior footboards during periods of overcrowding. This practice is discouraged by the police and can cause fatal accidents.

Mini Buses

Mini buses are smaller in size and primarily operate on shorter routes. These buses are very basic in terms of security and comfort, and are not equipped with automatic doors. However, mini buses can travel faster than low floor and semi-low floor buses. All 120 mini buses in Lucknow Mahanagar Parivahan Sewa are manufactured by Swaraj Mazda.

Computerization and GPS

All Lucknow Mahanagar Parivahan Sewa buses are under observation and can be tracked. Screens displaying information on upcoming departures are placed at bus stops. Cameras are placed in each bus so that both staff and passenger activity can be recorded. All cameras are under observation in a central observatory, and these observers are seen in turn through surveillance cameras monitored by higher authorities. By using GPS, bus timings can be shared easily and reliably.

Fares

Fares of AC buses

Fares of Non-AC buses

Fares of Mini and Semi low floor buses

Bus pass and discount travel

Regular commuters can take advantage of the Concessional Pass System. One trip each way per month is available for monthly pass holders. There are passes for 1 month, 3 months, 6 months and 1 year periods. Passes can be produced for a specific route and can also be unlimited based on the commuter's needs.

Citizens falling under the following categories are permitted to travel for free incorporation buses.

1. Distinguished Citizens

 Members of Parliament-Lok Sabha / Rajya Sabha and one co-passenger
 Members of the Legislative Assembly U.P. and one co-passenger
 Members of the Legislative Council of U.P. and one co-passenger
 Distinguished Reporters
 Freedom Fighters and one co-passenger
 Ex-members of the Legislative Assembly U.P. and one co-passenger
 Ex-members of the Legislative Council of U.P. and one co-passenger

Taxes and surcharges apply to co-passengers and reporters.

2. Citizens decorated with Bravery Award

3: Physically handicapped & blind
senior citizens and other adults will be valid for A/C and non-A/C buses.

See also
 Lucknow Upnagariya Parivahan Sewa

References

External links 
Official website of UPSRTC

Official website of city bus

Transport in Lucknow
State road transport corporations of India
State agencies of Uttar Pradesh
Metropolitan transport agencies of India
2005 establishments in Uttar Pradesh